David Charles Luckman (born 21 April 1976) is a British sport shooter.

Sport shooting career
He won gold medals in both the Queen's prize individual and pairs events at the 2014 Commonwealth Games whilst competing for England. Four years later he sealed another double gold medal success at the 2018 Commonwealth Games.

He has won the prestigious Queen's Prize twice, in 2018 and 2020.

Personal life
He is the younger brother of the Commonwealth Games bronze medallist Andrew Luckman.

References

External links
 
 
 

1976 births
Living people
English male sport shooters
Commonwealth Games medallists in shooting
Commonwealth Games gold medallists for England
Shooters at the 2014 Commonwealth Games
Shooters at the 2018 Commonwealth Games
Medallists at the 2014 Commonwealth Games
Medallists at the 2018 Commonwealth Games